Abryna coenosa is a species of beetle in the family Cerambycidae. It was described by Newman in 1842. It is known from Taiwan and the Philippines.

Subspecies
 Abryna coenosa coenosa Newman, 1842
 Abryna coenosa mindanaonis Breuning, 1980
 Abryna coenosa superba Pic, 1932

References

Pteropliini
Beetles described in 1842